Top Dutch Solar Racing (TDSR) is a student solar racing team from Groningen, the Netherlands. It was founded in February 2017 and participated in the challenger class of the Bridgestone World Solar Challenge (BWSC) for the first time in 2019. In contrast to the cruiser class, cars competing in the challenger class are designed to reach the finishing line of the BWSC as fast and efficiently as possible. Due to the cancelation of the 2021 edition of the BWSC, Top Dutch Solar Racing plans on participating again in the 2023 edition.

In contrast to other Dutch teams Vattenfall Solar Team, Solar Team Twente and Solar Team Eindhoven, Top Dutch Solar Racing is not affiliated with a particular (technical) university, but consists of students from different levels of education. Most team members study at the University of Groningen, Hanze University of Applied Sciences or Noorderpoort Groningen.

History 
Top Dutch Solar Racing was founded in 2017 by Jeroen Brattinga, Frank Pot, Eldert Zeinstra and Vincent Taselaar who were all students at Hanze University of Applied Sciences at the time. Their goal was to contribute to sustainable innovations and technology by building a solar car. Within two years, the first generation of the team, consisting of 26 students, built solar car Green Lightning.

In June 2020, the second generation of Top Dutch Solar Racing was formed in order to build the second TDSR solar car and to participate in the Bridgestone World Solar Challenge 2021. Due to the COVID-19 pandemic, the race was canceled in February 2021. In May 2021, the team announced its participation in the Moroccan Solar Challenge that will take place in October 2021. This alternative race will lead solar teams 2400 km through the Sahara desert and the Atlas mountains.

On July 7, 2021, Top Dutch Solar Racing revealed its second solar car, Green Spirit.

Achievements 

On October 13, 2019, Top Dutch Solar Racing started in the pole position of the 15th Bridgestone World Solar Challenge in Darwin, Australia. Five days later, on October 18, 2019, Green Lightning reached Adelaide and finished 4th after Bluepoint of Agoria Solar Team, Tokai Challenger of Tokai University Solar Car Team and Electrum of University of Michigan Solar Car Team. Due to technical issues and accidents of Solar Team Twente and Vattenfall Solar Team, Top Dutch Solar Racing was the best Dutch team participating in the challenger class during the BWSC 2019. The team also received the Excellence in Engineering Award as recognition for its good performance considering the lack of experience of the team.

Between September 21 and September 23rd 2020, Top Dutch Solar Racing participated in the iLumen European Solar Challenge in Heusden-Zolder, Belgium. Besides winning the dynamic parcours challenge, the team won third place at the 24-hour race with 302 completed laps and set a track record of 2:42:767

References 

Solar-powered vehicles
Motor racing
2017 establishments in the Netherlands
Student sport